The 2011 Kvalserien was the 37th Kvalserien, played between 14 March and 8 April 2011. Växjö Lakers Hockey and Modo Hockey, who finished 1st and 2nd respectively, qualified for the 2011–12 Elitserien season. Södertälje SK were relegated to HockeyAllsvenskan.

Växjö were the best team in this year's Kvalserien, winning nine games and going undefeated in regulation time. Växjö had already secured their Elitserien spot after the 8th round (Kvalserien has 10 rounds), and thus the team's two following games were unimportant for them, but the team still won 4–2 at home against Rögle and 5–3 away against Mora. Växjö's 4–2 win against Rögle in the ninth round extinguished Rögle's chances of qualifying for the 2011–12 Elitserien season. Växjö finished with 26 points, which is a record in Kvalserien history.

After the 9th round, Modo and Södertälje both had 17 points. The teams met each other in Fjällräven Center in the final round, for a game that directly decided which team would be relegated to HockeyAllsvenskan. Modo won the game 2–0 and thus stayed in Elitserien for the 2011–12 season. This meant that Södertälje were relegated to HockeyAllsvenskan prior to the 2011–12 season.

Örebro made their first Kvalserien since re-qualifying for HockeyAllsvenskan in 2009. Mora made their first Kvalserien since 2008.

Standings

Game log 

|-
| rowspan="3" | 1 || rowspan="3" | March 14 || Södertälje SK || 3–2 (SO) || Modo Hockey || AXA Sports Center || 3,211
|-
| Växjö Lakers HC || 5–1 || Mora IK || Växjö Ishall || 2,852
|-
| Örebro HK || 6–7 (OT) || Rögle BK || Behrn Arena || 3,015
|-
| rowspan="3" | 2 || rowspan="3" | March 17 || Rögle BK || 1–2 || Växjö Lakers HC || Lindab Arena || 3,877
|-
| Mora IK || 1–6 || Södertälje SK || FM Mattsson Arena || 2,713
|-
| Modo Hockey || 6–3 || Örebro HK || Fjällräven Center || 5,852
|-
| rowspan="3" | 3 || rowspan="3" | March 19 || Södertälje SK || 6–2 || Rögle BK || AXA Sports Center || 3,722
|-
| Växjö Lakers HC || 4–2 || Örebro HK || Växjö Ishall || 3,183
|-
| Mora IK || 0–3 || Modo Hockey || FM Mattsson Arena || 3,514
|-
| rowspan="3" | 4 || rowspan="3" | March 23 || Örebro HK || 2–3 (OT) || Södertälje SK || Behrn Arena || 3,339
|-
| Rögle BK || 5–2 || Mora IK || Lindab Arena || 3,495
|-
| Modo Hockey || 1–0 (OT) || Växjö Lakers HC || Fjällräven Center || 5,508
|-
| rowspan="3" | 5 || rowspan="3" | March 25 || Södertälje SK || 2–3 (SO) || Växjö Lakers HC || AXA Sports Center || 4,053
|-
| Rögle BK || 2–1 (SO) || Modo Hockey || Lindab Arena || 4,509
|-
| Mora IK || 6–3 || Örebro HK || FM Mattsson Arena || 2,092
|-
| rowspan="3" | 6 || rowspan="3" | March 28 || Växjö Lakers HC || 5–1 || Södertälje SK || Växjö Ishall || 3,859
|-
| Örebro HK || 1–4 || Mora IK || Behrn Arena || 2,126
|-
| Modo Hockey || 1–2 || Rögle BK || Fjällräven Center || 4,731
|-
| rowspan="3" | 7 || rowspan="3" | March 30 || Södertälje SK || 1–4 || Örebro HK || AXA Sports Center || 3,147
|-
| Växjö Lakers HC || 3–2 (SO) || Modo Hockey || Växjö Ishall || 3,869
|-
| Mora IK || 2–4 || Rögle BK || FM Mattsson Arena || 2,112
|-

|-
| rowspan="3" | 8 || rowspan="3" | April 3 || Örebro HK || 2–5 || Växjö Lakers HC || Behrn Arena || 2,643
|-
| Rögle BK || 1–2 || Södertälje SK || Lindab Arena || 4,971
|-
| Modo Hockey || 8–1 || Mora IK || Fjällräven Center || 6,141
|-
| rowspan="3" | 9 || rowspan="3" | April 6 || Södertälje SK || 3–2 || Mora IK || AXA Sports Center || 4,846
|-
| Växjö Lakers HC || 4–2 || Rögle BK || Växjö Ishall || 3,845
|-
| Örebro HK || 1–4 || Modo Hockey || Behrn Arena || 3,126
|-
| rowspan="3" | 10 || rowspan="3" | April 8 || Rögle BK || 3–5 || Örebro HK || Lindab Arena || 2,766
|-
| Mora IK || 3–5 || Växjö Lakers HC || FM Mattsson Arena || 1,630
|-
| Modo Hockey || 2–0 || Södertälje SK || Fjällräven Center || 7,600
|-

References 
Official statistics for ice hockey in Sweden

Kvalserien
Kvalserien